Changai-ye Asgharabad may refer to either of two villages in Iran:

 Asgharabad, Khorramabad
 Changai